Ciliocera is a monotypic  snout moth genus described by Hans Georg Amsel in 1954. Its single species, Ciliocera leucosarca, described by Edward Meyrick in 1937, is found in Iraq.

References

Phycitinae
Monotypic moth genera
Moths of Asia
Taxa named by Hans Georg Amsel
Pyralidae genera